The Granada hare (Lepus granatensis), also known as the Iberian hare, is a hare species that can be found on the Iberian Peninsula and on the island of Majorca.

Subspecies
Three subspecies of the Granada hare are known, which vary in colour and size.
 L. g. granatensis is the most abundant subspecies, found in Andalusia, Extremadura, Meseta Central, Valencia and the south of Aragon and Catalonia. It is the only subspecies present in Portugal.
 L. g. gallaecius described by Gerrit Smith Miller Jr. in 1907 was a male adult hare collected in the Province of A Coruña. This subspecies with a darker coat occurs in the northwest of the Iberian Peninsula, in Galicia. 
 Majorcan hare, L. g. solisi is probably extinct nowadays or at least very rare. There have been no trustworthy sightings in recent years. This subspecies has a lighter coat and is smaller.

References

Endemic mammals of the Iberian Peninsula
Lepus
Mammals described in 1856